Nine Brothers Kherkheulidze with their mother and sister were heroes of the Battle of Marabda. All of them died defending their motherland.

Deaths
In 1625, Shah Abbas I of Persia marched his largest army towards his two Georgian vassal kingdoms of Kartli and Kakheti. In these areas, Teimuraz I of Kakheti and Giorgi Saakadze were putting heavy resistance against the Safavid overlordship. The Georgian Army consisted of twenty thousand men, while the banner was entrusted to the Nine Brothers Kherkheulidze. The Iranian army was put under the leadership of Isa-Khan Qurchibash.

The Persians panicked upon coming face-to-face with the courage and fortitude of the Georgian soldiers, but the experienced commander Isa-Khan Qurchibash would not yield. Help arrived from Beglerbeg Shaybani-Khan, and with the extra forces the Persians soon gained the advantage over the Georgian army. The Georgian colonel, Teimuraz Mukhranbatoni, was fatally wounded, and rumors of his death threw the soldiers into a panic, since they mistakenly believed that the dead man was King Teimuraz I of Kakheti, their commander.

Believing that their leader had fallen, the Georgian soldiers became anxious. Before long, they recognized their mistake, but it was too late, as the fate of the battle had already been decided.

The military leaders and the bishops of Rustavi and Kharchasho all were killed in the battle at Marabda. The nine banner-bearing Kherkheulidze brothers were also killed. When the banner, that had led their army through the battles at Didgori and Basiani, fell from the hands of the youngest brother, their sister grabbed hold of it immediately, and when she also fell, the banner and symbol of Georgian invincibility was raised up again by their mother, who also was killed.

The Georgians fought heroically to the last moment. The battle that had begun at dawn finally ended late that night with the defeat of the Georgian army. Nine thousand Georgians gave their lives for Christ and their motherland on the battlefield at Marabda. For their heroism, Nine Brothers Kherkheulidze with their mother and sister and nine thousand martyrs of Marabda were canonized by Georgian Orthodox Church. The self-sacrifice of Nine Brothers was represented in Georgian poetry.

Gallery

See also 
 Kherkheulidze
 Nine Jugović brothers killed in the Battle of Kosovo

References 
 Essays on the History of Georgia, fourth volume, Tbilisi, 1974
 Georgian Soviet Encyclopedia, eleventh volume, Tbilisi 1987

External links 

 Nine Kherkheulidze Brothers with their Mother and Sister and Nine Thousand Martyrs of Marabda from Antiochian Orthodox Christian Archdiocese of North America

Saints of Georgia (country)
1625 deaths
Christian saints killed by Muslims
Women in 17th-century warfare
Women in European warfare
Women in war in Western Asia
Sibling groups